Dunama Lefiami was the Mai (sultan) of the Kanem-Bornu Empire, located in what is now Nigeria, Cameroon and Chad during the early nineteenth century.

Life
Dunama succeeded his father Ahmad, an old and blind Mai who abdicated after the Fulani Jihad resulted in the capture of Ngazargamu.  Mai Dunama enlisted the support of Muhammad al-Amin al-Kanemi, to counter the Fulani in word and battle.  Dunama rewarded al-Kanemi with slaves and goods, after the defeat of Goni Mukhtar. In 1809, after Ngazarmu was again captured, the noblemen forced Dubama to abdicate, and Dunama's uncle Muhammad Ngileruma was made Mai. By 1813, the courtiers grew tired of Ngileruma, and reinstated Dunama as Mai. Mai Dunama was killed in battle when he led a revolt against al-Kanemi in 1819-20.

Dunama was succeeded by his son, Ibrahim.

References

Rulers of the Bornu Empire
19th-century monarchs in Africa
Nigerian warriors
Kanuri warriors
Kanuri people
Muslim monarchs
African people of Arab descent
Nigerian people of Arab descent
African warriors